Capronia harrisiana is a lichenicolous fungus on the tripartite foliose lichen Crocodia aurata. Although the host species is widespread in many areas of the world, no species of Capronia has previously been reported from Crocodia aurata, and Capronia harrisiana appears to be endemic to the southern Appalachian Mountains in southeastern North America. The new species is characterized by 50–120 µm wide ascomata, 40–95 µm long setae, (1–)3-septate, pale brown, 11.9–15.7 × 4.4–5.8 µm ascospores, and an I+ red hymenium.

References

Eurotiomycetes
Eurotiomycetes stubs
Fungi described in 2021
Fungi of North America